Pre-Ottoman Turkey is a book by Claude Cahen, published by Taplinger Pub Co in 1968 and translated from French into English by J. Jones-Williams. The book focuses on pre-Ottoman era of Anatolia via Anatolian beyliks and Seljuk Empire.

References

Non-fiction books about Turkey